Akpaki Dagbara II was the king of the Bariba State of Paraku, in eastern Benin, until his death in 2004. The throne remained vacant for almost eight years. Two candidates, one designated by the Baparapé chief, the other by chief of Gbégourou, both customarily empowered to appoint the successor of a deceased king, had battling for the throne. In 2012  Akpaki Boukou Kinnin II rose to become the king of State of Paraku.

See also
List of rulers of the Bariba state of Paraku
List of current constituent African monarchs

References

20th-century Beninese people
Obas of Benin
Beninese Ahmadis